Thiago Cazé da Silva (born 12 March 1990) is a Brazilian footballer who plays as a defender for Dorchester Town in England.

Career

Before the 2012 season, Cazé da Silva signed for Brazilian third division side Marília after playing for Ferroviário (CE) in the Brazilian top flight. After that, he signed for Bolivian third division club Oriente Petrolero B.

In 2014, Cazé da Silva signed for Lumezzane in the Italian third division, where he made 10 league appearances and scored 1 goal. On 10 September 2014, he debuted for Lumezzane during a 0-0 draw with Mantova. On 20 December 2014, Cazé da Silva scored his first goal for Lumezzane during a 1-3 loss to FeralpiSalò.

In the Europe season 2015/2016, Cazé  da Silva signed for Akragas in Italiy.

Before the second half of 2017/18, he signed for English seventh division team Weymouth.

In 2018, Cazé da Silva signed for Crema in Italy.

On 2019 , Cazé da Silva signed for Latina in Italy.

In 2020, he signed for English seventh division outfit Poole Town.

On 1 October 2021 , Cazé da Silva signed for Dorchester Town FC , in England.

References

External links
 
 Thiago Cazé da Silva at playmakerstats.com

Brazilian footballers
Brazilian expatriate sportspeople in England
Brazilian expatriate sportspeople in Italy
Living people
Association football defenders
Brazilian expatriate footballers
Expatriate footballers in England
Expatriate footballers in Italy
Brazilian expatriate sportspeople in Bolivia
Expatriate footballers in Bolivia
Serie C players
1990 births
Poole Town F.C. players
Ferroviário Atlético Clube (CE) players
Marília Atlético Clube players
F.C. Lumezzane V.G.Z. A.S.D. players
Lucchese 1905 players
Carrarese Calcio players
Weymouth F.C. players
Serie D players
Latina Calcio 1932 players